Lagiacrusichthys macropinnis is a species of pearleyes. L. macropinnis live between 0–840 m depth, usually 500 m. This species occurs in Antarctic waters. This species is the only known member of its genus. The genus is named after Lagiacrus from the Monster Hunter series.

References

Aulopiformes
Fish described in 1966